The 2015 Kehoe Cup was an inter-county and colleges hurling competition in the province of Leinster. The competition was ranked below the Walsh Cup and featured second and third tier counties from Leinster.

Teams
County teams:
Fingal
Kildare
Longford
Louth
Meath
Wicklow
Third level:
Maynooth University
St Patrick's–Mater Dei (an amalgamation of Mater Dei Institute of Education and St Patrick's College, Drumcondra)

Results

Final

References

Kehoe Cup
Kehoe Cup